This is a list of some of the cattle breeds considered in China to be wholly or partly of Chinese origin. Some may have complex or obscure histories, so inclusion here does not necessarily imply that a breed is predominantly or exclusively Chinese.

References 

 
Livestock
Lists of Chinese domestic animal breeds